Monica Stucchi (born 28 May 1963), known by her stage name Valerie Dore, is an Italian singer.

Career 

Monica Stucchi was born in Milan, Italy. Prior to her career in music, she worked as graphic designer. In the early 1980s she fronted The Watermelon String Band, a bluegrass band led by the banjoist Bruno Guaitamacchi that performed in the Milan clubs circuit. 

Stucchi was discovered at age 20 by the Italo producer Roberto Gasparini, who launched her solo career and give her the stage name Valerie Dore to improve her international appeal. Dore's first single, "The Night" (1984) arranged by Lino Nicolosi, "Get Closer" and "It's So Easy", released in 1984 and 1985, respectively. During this time, the Italian music news publication TV Sorrisi e Canzoni ("Smiles and Songs") gave Valerie Dore the Best New Artist of the Year Award. She also finished second at Festivalbar and performed on the TV show "Azzurro" and on German TV.

In 1986, Dore began working with a new production team at Castello di Carimate on her first album, The Legend. Marco Tansini wrote the music, Simona Zanini wrote the lyrics and Dore recorded the ten songs that would form the album.

The Legend album's first single, "Lancelot," was a hit in Italy. The second single, "King Arthur," enjoyed moderate success in Europe, and was performed on the Italian music program Discoring. The songs "The Magic Rain" and "Bow and Arrow" were radio hits as well.

In 1986, Dore was voted the 6th best female artist in Italy by readers of TV Sorrisi e Canzoni. The following year, she changed production team again following a dispute over royalties and moved to London to record her new single "Wrong Direction", in co production with her future husband, Mauro Zavagli, for their new label "MZM PRODUCTION" (MauroZavagliMonica Production). Dore was aided in the studio by German producer Ralph Ruppert and collaborated with musicians Nick Beggs (of Kajagoogoo fame) and Marck Price. The record, however, was underpromoted in Italy and only reached #23 in the charts.

Between 1990 and 1991, Dore and her husband were in Madagascar where they began a collaboration with a local group. She considered recording a new album but after some initial contact with international labels, she decided against it.  

In 1992, the ZYX label released The Best of Valerie Dore with a few bonus tracks, including the extended versions of her dance hits "The Night", "Get Closer" and "It's So Easy," plus two remixes of "The Night" done by DJ Oliver Momm. In 1995, Zavagli and Dore moved to Arezzo, Toscana, where Dore started working as an antiquarian and restorer. In 2000 Zavagli and Dore separated.

Comeback
In November 2006, Dore recorded a new song "How do I get to Mars?" and launched her personal web site www.valeriedore.it (Italian). In 2007, she promoted non-smoking, on "Radio 24". She had been smoking for 15 years, and it was affecting her voice and shortening her career. She wanted to inspire others to stop smoking as well, and, through radio and in an internet forum, she encouraged abstinence. In 2007 she recorded more material in her home studio, eventually released in the 2014 album Greatest Hits & Remixes. 
She is preparing new publications.

Discography

Singles
1984 - "The Night" [#14 Italy, #8 Switzerland, #5 Germany, #23 France, #29 Austria]
1984 - "Get Closer" [#12 Germany, #12 Italy, #11 Switzerland, #33 France]
1985 - "It's So Easy" [#13 Italy, #10 Switzerland, #51 Germany]
1985 - "It's So Easy In The Night To Get Closer (Megamix)"
1986 - "Bow & Arrow"
1986 - "The Wizard"
1986 - "The Magic Rain"
1986 - "Guinnevere"
1986 - "King Arthur" [#26 Italy, #24 Switzerland]
1986 - "Lancelot" [#9 Italy, #36 Germany, #10 Switzerland]
1986 - "King Arthur"/"The Battle"
1987 - "The Sword Inside The Heart"
1987 - "The End Of The Story"
1988 - "On The Run"
1988 - "Wrong Direction" [#23 Italy]
2006 - "How do I get to Mars?"

Albums
1986 - The Legend
1992 - The Best Of Valerie Dore
2014 - Greatest Hits & Remixes

Citations

External links 

 
 
 

Italian women singers
1963 births
Living people
Italian Italo disco musicians
Singers from Milan
English-language singers from Italy